Chileshe Mpundu Kapwepwe, is a Zambian accountant and corporate executive, who serves as the Secretary General of the Common Market for Eastern and Southern Africa (COMESA), effective 18 July 2018. She was elected at the 20th Heads of State COMESA summit in Lusaka, Zambia's capital city.

Immediately prior to her current assignment, she was the chairperson of Zambia Revenue Authority. She replaces Sindiso Ngwenya, from Zimbabwe, whose two consecutive terms in office, had expired.

Background and education
Chileshe Mpundu Kapwepwe was born in Zambia on 10 July 1958. (Birthday needs editing. Why a different birthday with her twin sister Mulenga Kapwepwe?) She has a twin sister, Mulenga Mpundu Kapwepwe, who is an author and co-founder of the Zambian Women's History Museum. Chileshe Kapwepwe holds a Master of Business Administration and is a Chartered Certified Accountant. She is a Fellow of the Association of Chartered and Certified Accountants (ACCA) of the United Kingdom, and a Fellow of the Zambia Institute of Chartered Accountants (ZICA).

Career
Ms. Kapwepwe is a professional chartered accountant, with experience in the areas of governance, public policy and financial management. Her career extends over more than a quarter century in local, and international organisations, in both public and private sectors.

Past assignments include as the Executive Director for the International Monetary Fund for the Africa Group One Constituency, based in Washington, DC. She also served as the Deputy Minister of Finance and National Planning, in the Cabinet of Zambia. She has also served, in the past, as the Managing Director of the Zambia National Airports Corporation. Before that, she was the contracts manager of Société Générale de Surveillance, based in Geneva, Switzerland.

Other considerations
Kapwepwe has in the past, served on the boards of the following companies: (a) Zambia Revenue Authority, the first woman to serve in as the chairperson of that board, since the foundation of the Authority in 1994. (b) She also served on the board of the Bank of Zambia. (c) BP Zambia Plc and (d) the Zambia Privatization Trust Fund.

See also
 Trade and Development Bank

References

1958 births
Living people
Zambian women in business
Zambian accountants
Zambian chief executives
Alumni of the University of Bath
Zambian twins
Zambian women chief executives